Hull Kingston Rovers is an English rugby league club, and prior to the 1897–98 (being elected to the Yorkshire Senior Competition for the 1899–1900), it was a rugby union (RU) club, who have had numerous notable players (1,261 (excludes pre-1895 season Rugby Football Union players) as of 31 October 2018) throughout their history, each player of the rugby league era who has played (and so excludes non-playing substitutes) in a competitive first-class match (including those matches that were subsequently abandoned, expunged or re-played, but excluding friendlies) is included.

Players

 ^¹ = Played For Hull Kingston Rovers During More Than One Period 
 ^² = drop-goals are currently worth 1-point, but from the 1897–98 to prior to the 1973-74 all goals, whether; conversions, penalties, or drop-goals, scored two points, consequently during this time drop-goals were often not explicitly documented, and "0" indicates that drop-goals may not have been recorded, rather than no drop-goals scored. In addition, prior to the 1949–50, the Field-goal was also still a valid means of scoring points 
 ^³ = During the first two seasons of the Northern Union (now known as the Rugby Football League), i.e. the 1895–96 and 1896–97, conversions were worth 2-points, penalty goals 3-points and drop goals 4-points. 
 BBC = BBC2 Floodlit Trophy 
 CC = Challenge Cup 
 CF = Championship Final 
 CM = Captain Morgan Trophy 
 RT = League Cup, i.e. Player's № 6, John Player (Special), Regal Trophy 
 YC = Yorkshire County Cup 
 YL = Yorkshire League

References

External links
 Hull KR Heritage Numbers

Hull Kingston Rovers
Hull Kingston Rovers
Hull Kingston Rovers players